= Daiga =

Female given name

- Gender: Female
- Name day: October 16

Origin
- Region of origin: Latvia

Daiga is a Latvian feminine given name. The associated name day is October 16.
